Zarbince is a village in the municipality of Bujanovac, Serbia. According to the 2002 census, the town has a population of 652 people. Of these, 643 (98,61 %) were ethnic Albanians, 1 (0,15 %) Bosniaks, and 1 (0,15 %) other.

References

Populated places in Pčinja District
Albanian communities in Serbia